The Minister of Foreign Affairs of the Independent State of Samoa is a cabinet minister in charge of the Ministry of Foreign Affairs of Samoa, responsible for conducting foreign relations of the country.

The incumbent Minister of Foreign Affairs is Fiamē Naomi Mataʻafa, who has served since 2021.

Description of the office
Like other ministers, the Foreign Minister is formally appointed by the O le Ao o le Malo (Head of State) on the nomination of the Prime Minister, and is responsible to both the Prime Minister and the Legislative Assembly. The position may be held independently, or in conjunction with other ministerial responsibilities. From time to time, the Prime Minister has simultaneously served as Foreign Minister.

List of ministers
Political parties

Other factions

The following is a list of foreign ministers of Samoa since the establishment of the office in 1976:

Notes

References

Politics of Samoa
Government of Samoa
Samoa
 
1976 establishments in Samoa
Foreign Minister
Lists of Samoan people